James Jerome O'Rourke (May 4, 1915 – November 21, 1983) was an American canoeist who competed in the 1936 Summer Olympics. He was born and died in Yonkers, New York. He was the father of James O'Rourke, Jr.

In 1936 he and his partner John Lysak finished seventh in the folding K-2 10000 m event.

References
James O'Rourke's profile at Sports Reference.com

1915 births
1983 deaths
American male canoeists
Canoeists at the 1936 Summer Olympics
Olympic canoeists of the United States